Samson Mulugeta (born 14 December 1983 in Addis Ababa) is an Ethiopian footballer. Since the 2002–2003 season, he has played for Saint-George SA. Mulugeta is a defender and is part of the Ethiopia national football team.

References
 
 

1983 births
Living people
Sportspeople from Addis Ababa
Ethiopian footballers
Ethiopia international footballers
Saint George S.C. players
Association football defenders
21st-century Ethiopian people